Brad Edward Budde (born May 9, 1958) is a former American college and professional football player who was an offensive guard in the National Football League (NFL) for seven seasons during the 1980s.  Budde played college football for the University of Southern California (USC), and was an All-American and the winner of the Lombardi Award.  He was a first-round pick in the 1980 NFL Draft, and played professionally for the NFL's Kansas City Chiefs.

Early years
Budde was born in Detroit, Michigan.  He attended Rockhurst High School in Kansas City, Missouri.

College career
Budde attended the University of Southern California (USC) and played for the USC Trojans football team from 1976 to 1979.  He was the first player since World War II to start as a freshman.  Budde is one of USC's most highly decorated offensive lineman.  As a senior in 1979, he was a unanimous first-team All-American, runner-up in the Outland Trophy voting, USC Offensive Player of the Year, USC Most Inspirational Player, and an Academic All-American.  He was also selected as the first and only Lombardi Award winner in USC's history.  In 1980, Budde also earned the NCAA Post Graduate Scholarship. During his career at USC, Budde started in three Rose Bowls, all won by USC. In 1978, led by head coach John Robinson, USC won a share of the national championship.

Budde was elected to the College Football Hall of Fame in 1990, the USC Hall of Fame in 1999, and the Rose Bowl Hall of Fame in 2010.

Professional career
Budde was the eleventh pick in the first round of the 1980 NFL Draft by the Kansas City Chiefs. Budde and his father, All-Pro Ed Budde, became the first and only father and son in NFL history to be drafted in the first round to the same team and play the same position.  He played for the Chiefs through 1987.

Personal life
Off the field, Budde and his wife, Nicolette, worked with abused and neglected children through Camp Opportunity and Division of Family Services in Kansas City, Missouri.

Following retirement from the NFL in 1988, Budde returned to college and earned his master's degree in physical therapy from Loma Linda University. For the last 17 years, Brad has rehabilitated senior citizens as President of Budde Physical Therapy, Inc. From 1995 to 2005, Brad also worked as the offensive line coach at San Clemente High School and Orange Coast College.

In 2005 Budde founded GameDay Performance Systems, bringing the fundamentals of high performing sports teams into the workplace.

Budde lives with his wife Nicolette in Capistrano Beach, California.  They are the parents of two children, Sasha and Beau.  Sasha is a high school English teacher in Irvine, California and won the Teacher of Excellence award for the 2011–12 school year; she resides with her husband Sean in San Clemente, California. Beau is a high school social science teacher and is the quarterbacks coach and offensive coordinator at University High School in Irvine, known among students for assigning exceptionally large amounts of homework, especially in quarantine during the COVID-19 pandemic; he and his wife, Annette, live in Orange, California.

References

External links
 
 
 

1958 births
Living people
American physiotherapists
American football offensive guards
Kansas City Chiefs players
Orange Coast Pirates football coaches
USC Trojans football players
High school football coaches in California
All-American college football players
Loma Linda University alumni
Players of American football from Detroit
Sportspeople from Kansas City, Missouri
Players of American football from Kansas City, Missouri